An integrated receiver/decoder (IRD) is an electronic device used to pick up a radio-frequency signal and convert digital information transmitted in it.

Consumer IRDs

Consumer IRDs, commonly called set-top boxes, are used by end users and are much cheaper compared to professional IRDs. To curb content piracy, they also lack many features and interfaces found in professional IRDs such as outputting uncompressed SDI video or ASI transport stream dumps. They are also designed to be more aesthetically pleasing.

Professional IRDs
Commonly found in radio, television, Cable and satellite broadcasting facilities, the IRD is generally used for the reception of contribution feeds that are intended for re-broadcasting. The IRD is the interface between a receiving satellite dish or Telco networks and a broadcasting facility video/audio infrastructure. 

Professional IRDs have various features that consumer IRDs lack such as:

 SDI outputs.
 ASI inputs / outputs.
 TSoIP inputs.
 AES/EBU Audio decoding.
 VBI reinsertion.
 WSS data and pass through.
 Transport stream demultiplexing.
 Genlock input.
 Frame synchronization of digital video output to analogue input.
 Closed captions and VITS/ITS/VITC Insertion.
 Video test pattern generator.
 Remote management over LAN/WAN.
 GPI interface - For sending external alarm triggers.
 Rack mountable.

Uses
 direct broadcast satellite (DBS) television applications like DirecTV, Astra or DishTV
 fixed service satellite (FSS) applications like VideoCipher, DigiCipher, or PowerVu
 digital audio radio satellite (DARS) applications like XM Satellite Radio and Sirius Satellite Radio
 digital audio broadcasting (DAB) applications like Eureka 147 and IBOC
 digital video broadcasting (DVB) applications like DVB-T and ATSC

See also

 ATSC tuner

Broadcast engineering
Set-top box
Television technology
Television terminology